Following the end of the 9-year terms of 127 "series C" senators, indirect senatorial elections were held in France on September 26, 2004.

This was the last renewal of serie C senators- following the electoral reform, senators are not elected by thirds to nine-year terms but by halves to six-year terms.

Since 2001, 10 seats had been added to Senate. This election elected Senators from 28 departments on the mainland (115 seats including 107 incumbents and 8 new seats), 2 from Guadeloupe and Martinique (5 seats including 4 incumbents and one new seat), 2 from overseas territories, Mayotte and Saint-Pierre-et-Miquelon (3 seats including 2 incumbents and one new seat), and 4 senators representing French citizens abroad.

The 117 incumbents were divided in the following way:

 65 from the Union for a Popular Movement (UMP) group
 23 from the Socialist Party group
 11 from the Communiste, Républicain et Citoyen group
 10 from the Union Centriste-Union for French Democracy
 7 from the Rassemblement démocratique et social européen
 1 miscellaneous from the MPF

Results

Source:

2004
Senate Election
Senate Election